The 2020 Virginia Question 1, also known as the Virginia Redistricting Commission Amendment was a proposed amendment to the Virginia Constitution to establish a political commission in order to draw the districts of the U.S House of Representatives seats in Virginia, as well as the districts of the Virginia House of Delegates and State Senate. The amendment was on the November 3 ballot. According to a Christopher Newport University poll over 70% of Virginians support redistricting reform. The amendment shifted the power of redistricting from the Virginia General Assembly to a political commission composed of four members from the Virginia Senate, with two from each party; four members from the Virginia House of Delegates, with two from each party; and eight other citizens of Virginia. The amendment passed with 65.69% of the vote, winning a majority of support in every county and independent city with the exception of Arlington County, Virginia.

Support
The initiative was supported by Republicans and had the support of the Virginia AARP and ACLU.

Opposition
The initiative was opposed by the state Democratic Party and some elected Democrats on the grounds that it would give inordinate power to the judges tasked with selecting citizens for the commission and that the system would not guarantee the representation of minorities on the commission. In August 2020, Former Virginia Democratic Chairman and candidate for Lieutenant Governor in 2021 Paul Goldman wrote a letter to the Virginia Department of Elections, arguing the wording of the question was misleading. The Virginia Supreme Court rejected this challenge saying that the Department of Elections must put the question on the ballot with the wording agreed to by the legislature.

Polling
Question 1

Results
The amendment passed with 65.59% of the vote. Only Arlington County voted against the amendment.

Notes

References 

Redistricting commissions
Gerrymandering in the United States
Question 1
Virginia Question 1
Virginia ballot measures